Dzikowice  is a village in the administrative district of Gmina Szprotawa, within Żagań County, Lubusz Voivodeship, in western Poland.

The village has a population of 526.

References

Dzikowice